Ethel Hillyer Harris was an American author.

Biography
Ethel Hillyer was born and reared in Rome, Georgia. She was educated in Shorter College, and while still a student was regarded as an unusually bright and original writer. She graduated after taking the full course, including music, Latin and French. Her love for Rome, her "hill-girt city," is one of her strongest characteristics, and her enthusiastic devotion to her native land is deep-rooted. A daughter of Dr. Eben Hillyer ana a granddaughter of Judge Junius Hillyer, she comes from one of the best families in the State. Her grandfather served five years in Congress and was the friend of such men as Stephens, Toombs, Hill and Cobb. Mrs. Harris is a niece of Judge George Hillyer, of Atlanta, a prominent member of the Georgia bar. On her grandmother's side she is a lineal descendant of Lyman Hall and George Walton, two of the signers of the Declaration of Independence, and consequently she is a " Daughter of the Revolution." After a happy girlhood she became the wife of T. W. Hamilton Harris, a young lawyer, of Cartersville, Ga., and two children blessed their union. One of these, a son, died young, the other, a yellow-haired little girl, survives. Mrs. Harris has contributed to some of the leading papers of the country, and many of her negro dialect and pathetic sketches have been praised by eminent critics. Her friends number a charming coterie of literary people, who honor and appreciate all that comes from her pen, and in society she ever finds a warm welcome.

References

External links
 
 

1859 births
1931 deaths
19th-century American writers
19th-century American women writers
Wikipedia articles incorporating text from A Woman of the Century